Karla Lorena Godinez Gonzalez is a Canadian freestyle wrestler. She won one of the bronze medals in the 55kg event at the 2022 World Wrestling Championships held in Belgrade, Serbia. She won the gold medal in her event at the 2022 Pan American Wrestling Championships held in Acapulco, Mexico. In July 2022, she won silver at the Grand Prix of Spain.

She won the silver medal in the women's 53kg event at the Grand Prix de France Henri Deglane 2023 held in Nice, France.

Godinez is from Coquitalm, British Columbia. Her sister, Ana Godinez, is also a competitive wrestler.

Achievements

References

External links 
 

Living people
Year of birth missing (living people)
Place of birth missing (living people)
Canadian female sport wrestlers
Pan American Wrestling Championships medalists
World Wrestling Championships medalists
21st-century Canadian women